Notodoma is a genus of beetles belonging to the family Histeridae.

The species of this genus are found in Southeastern Asia, including Japan.

Species:

Notodoma fungorum 
Notodoma globatum 
Notodoma lewisi 
Notodoma rufulum 
Notodoma solstitiale 
Notodoma strigosulum

References

Histeridae